William Henry Wynn-Williams (1828 – 27 October 1913) was a 19th-century Member of Parliament from Canterbury, New Zealand. He was a prominent lawyer in Christchurch.

Early life
Wynn-Williams was born in August 1828 in Llangar, Conwy County Borough, North Wales.

His father was the rector Peter Williams, and his mother was Lydia Sophia Price. One of his brothers was Watkin Williams. The birth dates for William and Charles are uncertain, as they were apparently born in August and September 1828, respectively *Parish registers of Llangar show Watkin baptised in Sept 1827 & Henry in Sept 1828.

His brother Charles studied medicine initially, but changed to a law degree. William was educated in preparation for joining the Indian army, but then also studied law. After practising in Wales for two years, William emigrated to New Zealand, arriving in Wellington in 1856. He worked on farms in the South Island and settled in Christchurch in 1860.

Professional career

He began practising law in New Zealand in July 1860 when he joined the practice of Harry Bell Johnstone, who had started his legal firm in January 1859. Johnstone ceased to practice in 1864, but Wynn-Williams remained with the firm until 1912. The firm of Wynn Williams & Co still exists today.

He was involved in conveyancing, criminal trials and significant civil litigation. He is described as fearless and often represented the underdog.

Political career

Political activism
George Allen was a leader of several protest groups. One such group, the Ratepayers' Mutual Protection Association, challenged the right of the Christchurch City Council to exist. Wynn-Williams was active with the group and took the case to court. Ratepayers started to withhold their rates, and in April 1866 the Council was forced to drastically cut expenditure in order to fend off bankruptcy. Staff were laid off, street cleaning suspended, some streets no longer lit and contracts cancelled. In May 1866, the city drainage scheme was abandoned, a project that had been estimated to cost £160,000. A shipment of pipes that had just arrived from England was sold off, ensuring Christchurch's reputation as the most polluted and unhealthy city for another 20 years. Wynn-Williams eventually lost the lengthy case and left the Ratepayers' Mutual Protection Association, which then folded.

Provincial Council
Wynn-Williams was a member of the Canterbury Provincial Council from 1865 until the abolition of provincial government with one interruption. He represented Heathcote (July 1865 – May 1866), City of Christchurch (June 1866 – November 1870) and Papanui (October 1871 – June 1875).

Member of Parliament

The 10 December 1881 general election in the Heathcote electorate was contested by the incumbent James Fisher, Wynn-Williams and Major Alfred Hornbrook. They received 119, 243 and 167 votes, respectively. Wynn-Williams was thus elected with a majority of 76 votes.

Wynn-Williams was an advocate of the working class. Although the Christchurch newspaper The Press was conservative and thus from the opposite end of the political spectrum than Wynn-Williams, they praised him in an editorial on 21 April 1883 for speaking his forthright opinion rather than following the attitude of other politicians of saying what the voters want to hear and what is popular with them:

It gives us a new and a delightful sensation to read the speech he made to his constituents at Woolston on Thursday evening so free it is from humbug or deception, and so vigorous with fearless candor.

His great-grandson, Robert Wynn-Williams, used the editorial as inspiration for the title of his biography.

The nominations for the 1884 general election in the Heathcote electorate took place on 16 July. The 22 July election was contested by the incumbent Wynn-Williams, John Coster and James Fisher. They received 245, 445 and 15 votes, respectively. Coster was thus, with a majority of 200 votes, elected to represent Heathcote in the 9th New Zealand Parliament.

Community involvement
Wynn-Williams was on the council of the Canterbury Society of Arts, a group organising exhibitions of paintings. In 1881, he was vice-president of that organisation.

Death
He died on 27 October 1913 and is buried at Barbadoes Street Cemetery.

Bibliography

References

1828 births
1913 deaths
Members of the New Zealand House of Representatives
Members of Canterbury provincial executive councils
People from Christchurch
19th-century New Zealand lawyers
Burials at Barbadoes Street Cemetery
Unsuccessful candidates in the 1884 New Zealand general election
Unsuccessful candidates in the 1871 New Zealand general election
New Zealand MPs for Christchurch electorates
People from Llansannan
Welsh emigrants to New Zealand
19th-century New Zealand politicians